Schistura spekuli is a species of ray-finned fish, a troglobitic stone loach, in the genus Schistura. It has been recorded from a single cave in central Vietnam. The specific name refers to SPEKUL, the speleological club of the University of Leuven in Belgium.

References

S
Fish described in 2004